Trichonis blenny, Salaria economidisi, is a species of fish in the family Blenniidae. It is endemic to Greece.  It is only found in Lake Trichonis where it is threatened by habitat loss.  This species reaches a length of  SL.

References

Trichonis blenny
Endemic fauna of Greece
Freshwater fish of Europe
Fish described in 2004
Taxonomy articles created by Polbot